Losing Earth: A Recent History (published as Losing Earth: The Decade We Could Have Stopped Climate Change in the UK and Commonwealth markets) is a 2019 book written by Nathaniel Rich. The book is about the existence of scientific evidence for climate change for decades while it was politically denied, and the eventual damage that will occur as a result. It focuses on the years 1979 to 1989 and US-based scientists, activists, and policymakers including James Hansen and Jule Gregory Charney.

The story was first published as the August 5, 2018, issue of The New York Times Magazine and later expanded. After the article was published, it was announced that the story was in development to be converted into a docuseries that will be distributed on Apple TV+.

Responses

Initial version of text 
Environmentalists including May Boeve criticized the narrative for promoting climate doom and focusing on a small group that they argue is not representative of the broader climate movement. Leah Stokes and others have questioned Rich's framing of who is to blame for the climate crisis; Rich did not emphasize the culpability of the fossil fuel industry or of politicians.

Expanded version of text 
In Bookforum, Roy Scranton wrote that "the book is substantially the same as the article" and pointed out its lack of citations. The book received a starred review in Booklist, where it was called "a must-read handbook for everyone concerned about our planet’s future." A review in NPR said it was "like a Greek tragedy".

See also
Climate change denial
Politics of global warming
Scientific consensus on climate change
Noordwijk Climate Conference

References

External links 
 
 

2019 non-fiction books
Farrar, Straus and Giroux books
Climate change books